Conservative Council was the name of the Dominican upper chamber between November 1844 and February 1854.

The Dominican Constitution of 1844 foresaw the existence of two chambers in the national congress: the Conservative Council and the Tribune, upper and lower chambers which in other Dominican constitutions of the nineteenth and twentieth centuries received the name of Senate and Chamber of Deputies or Representatives; With that it was intended to conform a system according to the model of the United States Congress, which would correspond to the Conservative Council a similar function to the Senate in the United States.

The designation of the president of the Conservative Council corresponded to the same chamber, of a triad voted by the members. The sessions of the Conservative Council were held the current Borgellá Palace in the Plaza Colon of the Colonial City of Santo Domingo, in front of the first town hall in the Palace Hall.

The Constitution of 1844 was amended twice in the year 1854, one in February and one in December. During the amendments made in February 1854 the Tribunate changed its name to the House of Representatives and the Conservative Council to the Senate. With the amendments of December 1854 Dominican Republic accepts to the unicameral system, establishing only a Consultative Senate. With the entry into force of the Constitution of Moca of 1858 became in Dominican Republic to the bicameral legislature.

Composition 
The appointment of the councilors was by indirect census suffrage at the rate of 1 for each of the 5 provinces that formed the newly created nation on two levels (Santo Domingo, Santiago or Cibao, Azua, La Vega and El Seibo). Counselors would last 6 years and could be re-elected indefinitely.

The conditions necessary to be a member of the Conservative Council were:

Attributions 
Article 67 of the Constitution of San Cristóbal established the exclusive powers of the Conservative Council. These attributions were:

In case of death, resignation or dismissal of a member of the Conservative Council, the Tribunate proceeded to its replacement electing a citizen who met all the qualities required to be Conservative. The new member only held the position for the time remaining to serve his term to the replaced member. The members of this body received a compensation of three hundred pesos during each session. In 1847 the President of this body, Mr. Juan Nepomuceno Tejera defended the position of Tomas Bobadilla y Briones Tribune when he demanded from outside the right to rejoin his legislative functions.

References 

Defunct upper houses
Government of the Dominican Republic
Upper houses